Wreford-Brown is a surname. Notable people include:

 Anthony Wreford-Brown (1912–1997), English cricketer
 Charles Wreford-Brown (1866–1951), English cricketer and footballer
 Chris Wreford-Brown (born 1945), retired Royal Navy officer
 Oswald Wreford-Brown (1877–1916), English footballer and cricketer

Compound surnames
English-language surnames